Dear John is a romance novel by American writer Nicholas Sparks released in 2007. Sparks took inspiration from the real-life story of his cousin Todd Vance who served in the U.S. Armed Forces.  It was on The New York Times Best Seller list in 2007.

The story is about a couple who fall in love over one summer. They are separated during the man's military service. John Tyree, the main character, has a father with Asperger's syndrome. The story is partially set in Wilmington, North Carolina where John's father was a single parent who had difficulty having meaningful conversation with his son and has an obsession with coin collecting. John knows there is something different about him but he has never found out what it is. Feeling a lack of direction and no strong fatherly influence in his life, John enlisted in the U.S. Armed Forces.

John returns home on leave from the army when he gets news of his father's death. After the return he seeks out Savannah, where he is surprised to learn of her life events following her marriage to another man. It was obvious to John, Savannah, and even her new husband, that Savannah still had love for John. But he decided to let Savannah go, because he cared about her more than himself. 
Although drained by battle overseas and the loss of Savannah, he realizes that due to a legacy from his father, he's able to express his love in an unexpected way.

Film adaptation

Dear John was adapted into a film in 2010 starring Channing Tatum as John Tyree and Amanda Seyfried as Savannah Curtis. The film was directed by Lasse Hallström and screenplay was written by Jamie Linden.

References

External links
 Official website: Dear John
 Dear John (Amazon)

2007 American novels
American romance novels
Novels set in North Carolina
Novels by Nicholas Sparks
American novels adapted into films
Wilmington, North Carolina
Books about autism